The term underground dance music (short version in music jargon: UDM) has been applied to artistic dance music movements, such as early 1970s disco and 1980s Chicago house, but the term has since then come to be defined by any electronic dance or house music artist/band that avoids becoming a trend/mainstream nowadays. Other early "underground dance music" artists include Little Louie Vega, Tony Humphries, Larry Levan, David Mancuso, Frankie Knuckles, Nicky Siano, Lenties Deep and many others. In the late 1970s, the term underground dance music was associated with the music initially played at places like Paradise Garage, The Loft and The Warehouse.

Dance music genres
Musical culture
Underground culture